The Saint Martin–Sint Maarten border, or France–Netherlands border, is the border between the Collectivity of Saint Martin, an overseas collectivity of France, and Sint Maarten, a constituent country of the Kingdom of the Netherlands, on the island of Saint Martin in the Caribbean. The  island is divided roughly 60:40 between the French Republic and the Kingdom of the Netherlands by the 16 km (10 mi) border, however the two parts are roughly equal in population.

Description
The border starts in the west at Cupecoy Bay and then proceeds eastward, cutting across Rue de Terre-Basses/Rhine Road. It then runs through the Simpson Bay Lagoon between the island of Little Key (Dutch) and Grand Islet (French). Back on land it crosses Rue de Hollande/Union Road and then turns north-eastwards, running across Sint Peter Hill, Mont des Accords, Concordia Hill, Marigot Hill, Mount Reward and Mount Flagstaff. It then turns south-eastwards and then eastwards, terminating in the east at Oysters Pond bay.

History

Historically the home of native Arawak and Carib people, the island of Saint Martin was first discovered by Europeans in 1493 when Christopher Columbus sailed by on his second voyage to the Americas. Initially disputed between the Netherlands and Spain, the Spanish withdrew their claim in the 1640s, only for the French to begin settling on the north of the island. In order to avoid fighting over the matter, France and the Netherlands signed the Treaty of Concordia on 23 March 1648 which formally split the island into two jurisdictions. The final border was confirmed in 1817. Various local legends relate how the border was supposedly decided by a French and Dutch official walking round the island, the Dutch gaining less land due to their representative being drunk on genever.

In 1994, France and the Netherlands signed the Franco-Dutch treaty on Saint Martin border controls, which improved the mutual border controls at their airports on the island.

Today there is a movement in both Sint Maarten and Saint Martin promoting the unification of the island, which would make the border between them disappear.

Border crossings
The border is completely open and can be crossed freely.

References 

 
Borders of France
Borders of the Netherlands
International borders
Geography of Saint Martin (island)